The M'Clintock Ice Shelf was a Canadian ice shelf attached to northern Ellesmere Island.  By 1961/62, its connection was tenuous. Most of the shelf broke away during the period of 1963 through 1965 with the remainder (10 km2 lodged at Borup Point) breaking off in 1966. Subsequently, multi year landfast sea ice, containing ice shelf fragments, has covered the M’Clintock Inlet mouth.

References

Ellesmere Island
Ice shelves of Qikiqtaaluk Region